Calliophis haematoetron, commonly known as the blood-bellied coral snake, is a species of venomous elapid snake endemic to Sri Lanka.

Geographic range
It is found in central lowlands of Sri Lanka. It is known from Wasgamuwa and Rattota.

Description
Frontal shorter or sub-equal to inter-parietal suture. First sub-labial does not contact second pair of chin-shields. Head relatively unpigmented. No light spots postero-lateral to parietals. Dorsum banded. Venter is bright red and red pigment lateral to blue under-tail colour.

Snake is known to produce 3 eggs at a time.

References
 http://reptile-database.reptarium.cz/species?genus=Calliophis&species=haematoetron
 http://eol.org/pages/1282253/hierarchy_entries/41233638/overview
 https://web.archive.org/web/20141004101244/http://www.srilankanreptiles.com/Snakes/CobrasKraitsCoralSnakesSeaSnakes.html
 https://books.google.com/books?id=wsySAwAAQBAJ&pg=PA145

haematoetron
Snakes of Asia
Reptiles of Sri Lanka
Reptiles described in 2008